The Eritrean ambassador in Washington, D. C. is the official representative of the Government in Asmara to the Government of the United States.

List of representatives

See also
Eritrea–United States relations

References 

 
United States
Eritrea